Betsy King was also a childhood name for Lizzie Lloyd King.

Betsy King (born August 13, 1955) is an American professional golfer. She became a member of the LPGA Tour in 1977 and won six major championships and 34 LPGA Tour victories in all.

Early life, college and amateur career
King was born on born August 13, 1955 in Reading, Pennsylvania. She graduated from Exeter Township High School in 1973. She played collegiately at Furman University, and was on the 1976 national championship team that included future LPGA players Beth Daniel, Sherri Turner and Cindy Ferro. She was low amateur at the 1976 U.S. Women's Open.

Professional career
King joined the LPGA Tour in 1977. She won her first tournament at the 1984 Women's Kemper Open. She won three titles in 1984, and added 21 top-10 finishes to earn LPGA Tour Player of the Year honors. From 1984 through 1989, she won a total of 20 LPGA events, more wins than any other golfer in the world, male or female, during that time period.

After that first win in 1984, King won at least once each of the next 10 years, with a high of six victories in 1989. She finished in the top-10 on the money list every year from 1985–95, and again in 1997. Along the way, she was named Player of the Year three times, won two scoring titles and three money titles. In 1993, she won a scoring title and the money title, but only one tournament. She finished second five times, including at two majors. She averaged a major a year from 1987 to 1992, then won a sixth major in 1997. The last of her 34 LPGA wins came in 2001. With her 30th win in 1995, she gained entry into the World Golf Hall of Fame.

From 1996 to 2004, there was an event on Tour, the Wachovia LPGA Classic, hosted by King. She was also a worker for charitable causes, organizing Habitat for Humanity house building projects and working in former Soviet bloc countries with orphan relief agencies. She played for the United States in the Solheim Cup five times (1990, 1992, 1994, 1996, 1998) and was the captain of the 2007 United States team. She led the team to a 16-12 win over Europe in the 2007 Solheim Cup held in Halmstad, Sweden between September 14 and 16, 2007. 
In 2001, she was inducted into the National Polish-American Sports Hall of Fame.

Professional wins (39)

LPGA Tour (34)

1Co-sanctioned by the LPGA of Japan Tour

LPGA Tour playoff record (8–6)

LPGA majors are shown in bold.

Ladies European Tour (1)
1985 Burberry Women's British Open
Note: King won the Women's British Open once before it became co-sanctioned by the LPGA Tour in 1994 and recognized as a major championship by the LPGA Tour in 2001

LPGA of Japan Tour (3)
1981 Ajinomoto-Itsuki Charity Classic
1992 Mazda Japan Classic1
1993 Toray Japan Queens Cup1
1Co-sanctioned by the LPGA Tour

Legends Tour (1)
2013 Fry's Desert Golf Classic (with Jane Crafter)

Other (3)
1990 Itoman LPGA World Match Play Championship
1993 JCPenney/LPGA Skins Game

Major championships

Wins (6)

1 Won on second extra hole with a par

Results timeline

^ The Women's British Open replaced the du Maurier Classic as an LPGA major in 2001.

CUT = missed the half-way cut.
WD = withdrew
DQ = disqualified
"T" = tied

Summary
Starts – 106
Wins – 6
2nd-place finishes – 4
3rd-place finishes – 6
Top 3 finishes – 16
Top 5 finishes – 24
Top 10 finishes – 35
Top 25 finishes – 55
Missed cuts – 19
Most consecutive cuts made – 38
Longest streak of top-10s – 8

Team appearances
Professional
Solheim Cup (representing the United States): 1990 (winners), 1992, 1994 (winners), 1996 (winners), 1998 (winners), 2007 (non-playing captain, winners)
Handa Cup (representing the United States): 2012 (tie, Cup retained), 2013

See also
List of golfers with most LPGA Tour wins
List of golfers with most LPGA major championship wins

References

External links

American female golfers
Furman Paladins women's golfers
LPGA Tour golfers
Winners of LPGA major golf championships
Solheim Cup competitors for the United States
World Golf Hall of Fame inductees
Golfers from Pennsylvania
American people of Polish descent
Sportspeople from Reading, Pennsylvania
1955 births
Living people